Amiral Charner was a  of the French Navy launched on 7 October 1932. She was designed to operate from French colonies in Asia and Africa. During the Franco-Thai War, she participated in the Battle of Koh Chang during the night of 16–17 January 1941. She was scuttled in the Mỹ Tho River in French Indochina on 10 March 1945.

References

Bibliography

 

 

Bougainville-class avisos
1932 ships
Maritime incidents in March 1945
Scuttled vessels